Sunnyslope is a historic home located in Hunts Point in the South Bronx in New York City.  It was built about 1860 by Peter Hoe, brother of Richard March Hoe, on their family estate.  It is a -story Gothic Revival–style house built in the Picturesque mode.  In 1919 it was sold to Temple Beth Elohim and later became home to an African Methodist Episcopal congregation.

It was listed as a New York City Landmark in 1981, and on the National Register of Historic Places in 1983. It later became home to Bright Temple A.M.E. Church.

References

Houses on the National Register of Historic Places in the Bronx
Gothic Revival architecture in New York City
Houses completed in 1860
History of the Bronx
Houses in the Bronx
Hunts Point, Bronx
1860 establishments in New York (state)
New York City Designated Landmarks in the Bronx